To the Ends of the Earth is the fourth live praise and worship by Hillsong United. The album reached the ARIA Albums Chart Top 100.

Track listing

References 

Hillsong United albums
2002 live albums

pt:To The Ends of the Earth